Xu Shaohua (born 1958) is a Chinese actor best known for his role as Tang Sanzang in the 1986 television series Journey to the West. Xu is the Vice-President of Shandong Theatre and Shandong Dramatist association.

Life
Xu was born in Huangdao District of Qingdao city, Shandong province in 1958. Xu aspired to act from an early age and he studied dance during his early years.  After the Cultural Revolution. On 6 November 1976, at the age of 18, Xu moved to Jinan from Qingdao, he lived in Jinan about 34 years. Xu entered Shandong University of Arts in August 1985, majoring in acting.

Xu rose to fame after portraying Tang Sanzang in Journey to the West, a historical television series starring Chi Zhongrui, Zhang Jinlai, Ma Dehua, Wang Yue, Yan Huaili, Cui Jingfu and Liu Dagang.

In 1983, Xu appeared in Outlaws of the Marsh, based on the novel by the same name by Shi Nai'an.

In 1994, Xu co-starred in the Romance of the Three Kingdoms as Zhang Liao, a television series adaptation based on the novel of the same name by Luo Guanzhong.

Xu also acted as Tang Sanzang or his historical prototype Xuanzang in several television series, such as Tang Xuanzang (1998), Love Legend of the Tang Dynasty (2001) and Carol of Zhenguan (2007).

Personal life
Xu married Yang Kun, their daughter, Xu Lu, was born in 1987.

Filmography

Film

Television

References

External links
 Xu Shaohua on Douban 
 

1958 births
Male actors from Qingdao
Shandong University of Arts alumni
Living people
Chinese male television actors
Chinese male film actors